Jackie Baumann (born 24 August 1995) is a retired German athlete who specialised in hurdling. She qualified for 2016 Summer Olympics where she finished 6th in her heat of the 400 m hurdles and did not qualify for the semifinals. She is a two-time German champion in the 400 m event. Her father, Dieter Baumann, was the Olympic champion in the 5000 m event at the 1992 Summer Olympics.

Personal bests

Outdoor

References

External links 
 
 
 
 
 

1995 births
Living people
German female hurdlers
Athletes (track and field) at the 2016 Summer Olympics
Olympic athletes of Germany